Friedrich August Ludwig von der Marwitz (29 May 1777, in Berlin – 6 December 1837, in Friedersdorf) was a Prussian nobleman, officer and opponent of the Prussian reforms of Heinrich Friedrich Karl vom Stein.
From Caroline Francisca (* 23. March 1783; † 28. March 1804) he received a daughter. His second wife, Charlotte née Gräfin von Moltke, (1780–1848), gave birth to nine children, one child died. They had three sons and five daughters. Their oldest daughter Karoline Franziska (* 28. February 1804; † 1888) married in 1824  Albert von Arnstedt (1794–1875), a grand son from Adam Friedrich von Arnstedt.

1777 births
1837 deaths
Friedrich August
Prussian commanders of the Napoleonic Wars
Lieutenant generals of Prussia
Members of the Provincial Parliament of Brandenburg
Military personnel from Berlin